Akinari (written: ,  or ) is a masculine Japanese given name. Notable people with the name include:

, Japanese footballer
, Japanese writer and poet

Japanese masculine given names